Aufhof is a settlement of the Upper Swabian municipality of Eppishausen in the Unterallgäu district of Germany. The single settlement is about six kilometers northeast of the main town and is connected to it via the state road St 2027 and the district road MN 3. It originally belonged to the municipality of Könghausen and was incorporated into the municipality of Eppishausen on July 1, 1972 as part of the regional reforms in Bavaria.

Notes

References 

Unterallgäu
Populated places in Bavaria